Chalcothore is a genus of damselfly in family Polythoridae. It contains the following species:
 Chalcothore montgomeryi

References 

Zygoptera genera
Polythoridae
Taxonomy articles created by Polbot